John Tripp (22 July 1927 – 16 February 1986) was an Anglo-Welsh poet and short-story writer.

Born in Bargoed, Wales, he worked for the BBC as a journalist with the BBC, and later became a civil servant. He edited the literary magazine, Planet, and was a popular performance poet.  The John Tripp Spoken Poetry Award was founded to commemorate him.

Works
The Province of Belief
The Inheritance File
Collected Poems (1978)

References

Nigel Jenkins – Writers of Wales: John Tripp (1989)
BookRags
The Meaning of Apricot Sponge – Selected Writings of John Tripp edited by Tony Curtis, Parthian Books, 2010

1927 births
1986 deaths
Anglo-Welsh poets
20th-century Welsh poets